Nicklas Maripuu (born 2 March 1992) is a Swedish footballer who plays for Brommapojkarna as a midfielder.

Career
In 2016 Maripuu signed with the NASL Jacksonville Armada FC.

Maripuu left IFK Mariehamn at the end of 2018.

On 22 December 2021, Maripuu signed with Brommapojkarna for the 2022 season.

References

External links

1992 births
Living people
People from Mölndal
Sweden youth international footballers
Swedish footballers
Swedish people of Estonian descent
Association football midfielders
AFC Eskilstuna players
AIK Fotboll players
Umeå FC players
GIF Sundsvall players
IK Sirius Fotboll players
Jacksonville Armada FC players
IFK Mariehamn players
Akropolis IF players
Degerfors IF players
IF Brommapojkarna players
Allsvenskan players
Superettan players
Ettan Fotboll players
Veikkausliiga players
North American Soccer League players
Swedish expatriate footballers
Expatriate footballers in Finland
Swedish expatriate sportspeople in Finland
Expatriate soccer players in the United States
Swedish expatriate sportspeople in the United States
Sportspeople from Västra Götaland County